The 1923 Copa Ibarguren was the 11° edition of this National cup of Argentina. It was played by the champions of both leagues, Primera División and Liga Rosarina de Football crowned during 1923.

Boca Juniors (Primera División champion) faced Rosario Central (Liga Rosarina champion) at Sportivo Barracas Stadium. Although they had won their league titles in 1923, the final was played in 1924.

Qualified teams 

Note

Venue

Match details

References

i
1923 in Argentine football
1923 in South American football